Iridomyrmex cupreus is a species of ant in the genus Iridomyrmex. Described in 2011, specimens have only been collected in Lake Eyre in South Australia.

References

Iridomyrmex
Hymenoptera of Australia
Insects described in 2011